The 6th National Geographic Bee was held in Washington, D.C. on May 25, 1994, sponsored by the National Geographic Society. The final competition was moderated by Jeopardy! host Alex Trebek. The winner was Anders Knospe of Bozeman, Montana, who won a $25,000 college scholarship. The 2nd-place winner, Michael Bebow of Metairie, Louisiana, won a $15,000 scholarship. The 3rd-place winner, Jeorse Lund of Henderson, Nevada, won a $10,000 scholarship.

References

External links
 National Geographic Bee Official Website

National Geographic Bee